The 2011 Nigerian Senate election in Nasarawa State was held on April 9, 2011, to elect members of the Nigerian Senate to represent Nasarawa State. Suleiman Adokwe representing Nasarawa South and Abdullahi Adamu representing Nasarawa West won on the platform of Peoples Democratic Party, while Yusuf Musa Nagogo representing Nasarawa North won on the platform of Congress for Progressive Change.

Overview

Summary

Results

Nasarawa South 
Peoples Democratic Party candidate Suleiman Adokwe won the election, defeating Congress for Progressive Change candidate Tanko Wanbai and other party candidates.

Nasarawa West 
Peoples Democratic Party candidate Abdullahi Adamu won the election, defeating Congress for Progressive Change candidate Ahmed Abokie and other party candidates.

Nasarawa North 
Congress for Progressive Change candidate Yusuf Musa Nagogo won the election, defeating Peoples Democratic Party candidate Patrick Naomia and other party candidates.

References 

April 2011 events in Nigeria
Nas
Nasarawa State Senate elections